Adam Hann-Byrd (born February 23, 1982) is an American actor and screenwriter most recognized for his roles in the films Jumanji, The Ice Storm, Halloween H20: 20 Years Later, and as the title character in Little Man Tate.

Early life
Hann-Byrd was born in New York City, the son of Jacquie Hann, a children's book illustrator and author, and Jeff Byrd, a television cameraman. He has one sister, Maya. In 2004, Hann-Byrd graduated from Wesleyan University in Connecticut with degrees in psychology and film studies.

Career
Hann-Byrd made his film debut in 1991's Little Man Tate, directed by and also starring Jodie Foster. In 1995, he appeared as the young Alan in Jumanji at age 13, in which Robin Williams appeared as the adult version of the character. He has also appeared in films such as Diabolique (1996) and The Ice Storm (1997). In 1998, he appeared as Charlie Deveraux in Halloween H20: 20 Years Later and in Uninvited in 1999.

In 2009, Hann-Byrd began working behind the camera after getting a job in the writers room for the second and third seasons of the television show Fringe. In 2011, he spent a year as a fellow in the Warner Bros. Television Writers Workshop. Subsequently, Hann-Byrd served as a writer for the Hulu series The Morning After and as a writer/producer for Participant Media's Brain Food Daily.

Personal life
Hann-Byrd resides in Los Angeles, California. In 2017, he married Dara Epstein.

Filmography

References

External links
 

1982 births
American male film actors
Living people
Male actors from New York City
Wesleyan University alumni